Mușenița is a commune located in Suceava County, Bukovina, northeastern Romania. It is composed of five villages, namely: Baineț (the commune center), Climăuți, Mușenița, Vășcăuți, and Vicșani.

The river Ruda flows through Baineț and Vicșani villages, discharging into the Suceava River in the neighboring Dornești commune, while the river Grăvan flows through Vășcăuți village, discharging into the Siret River.

Vicșani railway station serves the Căile Ferate Române Line 500, which starts in Bucharest and ends at the Romania–Ukraine border here.

The Mușenița gas field is located on the territory of the commune.

Administration and local politics

Communal council 

The commune's current local council has the following political composition, according to the results of the 2020 Romanian local elections:

Notable people  

 Otto Babiasch, German-Romanian (of Bukovina German origin) Olympic boxer
 Nichita Danilov, Russian-Romanian poet (of Lipovan origin)
 Dumitru Ivanov, Romanian rower

Gallery

References 

Communes in Suceava County
Localities in Southern Bukovina
Romania–Ukraine border crossings
Polish communities in Romania